Chapin Hall at the University of Chicago is a policy research institution at the University of Chicago that focuses on child welfare and family well-being. Chapin Hall is funded through social service systems, foundations, and non-profit organizations. The organization's focus areas include child welfare and foster care systems, youth homelessness, and community capacity to support children, youth, and families (including early childhood initiatives, home visitation and maltreatment prevention, juvenile justice, and school systems). Chapin Hall is an affiliated research center of the University of Chicago.

History 
Chapin Hall at the University of Chicago was founded in 1860 as the Chicago Nursery and Half-Orphan Asylum. In addition to housing orphans and other dependent children, the Asylum provided day care services for working mothers.

In 1931, the Chicago Nursery and Half-Orphan Asylum moved into a building at 2800 West Foster Avenue. After the move, the organization became known by the name of that building, Chapin Hall Center for Children.

By the 1960s and 70s, Chapin Hall Center for Children was financially dependent on state money. During the 70s and 80s, national public policy shifted to fund institutional care for only "severely disturbed children." As a result of dwindling support, in 1984, Chapin Hall Center for Children decided to close its residential care program.

The following year, Chapin Hall Center for Children was re-opened as a policy research center affiliated with the University of Chicago. The goal of the newly formed organization was to conduct research about child welfare and well-being, in alignment with its history as a residential care facility. Harold A. Richman was the first executive director of the research center and held that role through 2008.

Research and policy initiatives 
Chapin Hall's three major areas of focus are child welfare, community capacity building, and youth homelessness. [9] Chapin Hall houses a number of ongoing initiatives related to child, youth, and family well-being.

Center for State Child Welfare Data 
The Center for State Child Welfare Data is a platform that enables public sector agencies to store and analyze administrative data related to children placed in out-of-home care. , 22 states used the platform, covering about 70% of children in the U.S. in the child welfare system.

One component of Center is the Foster Care Data Archive. The archive provides access to information about children in the foster care system over time.

In addition to providing a platform for the data, Chapin Hall staff help members analyze data for both policymaking and in practice.

Doris Duke Fellowship for the Promotion of Child Well-Being 
Chapin Hall receives financial support from the Doris Duke Charitable Foundation to run a fellowship program for current and recent graduate students interested in child well-being and maltreatment prevention.

Researchers in the program are from multiple disciplines including social work, child development, public health, medicine, public policy, education, economics, psychology, and epidemiology. Fellows receive thirty thousand dollars to complete their dissertation and related research.

Transformational Collaborative Outcomes Management 
Transformational Collaborative Outcomes Management (TCOM) is a framework for decision-making in complex systems.  TCOM provides tools and guidance on an individual, program, and system level to help support decisions, monitor outcomes, and improve quality in child welfare systems.

TCOM is the foundation of Child and Adolescent Needs and Strengths (CANS), an assessment strategy for monitoring the well-being of children and youth. CANS is broadly used in child welfare. As of 2018, the CANS was being used by nearly 5,000 agencies across 10 countries, including all 50 U.S. states. The assessment is used in the fields of child welfare, mental health, juvenile justice, autism and developmental health, and early intervention.

The CANS-MH is a variant of the CANS for children and adolescents with mental health challenges. The tool has been shown to be a "reliable measure of psychosocial needs and strengths".

Oak Park Collaboration for Early Childhood 
The Collaboration for Early Childhood is a nonprofit organization in Oak Park, Illinois that works to connect parents of young children to local resources. Their website also houses resource directories for health care professionals, educators, and service providers.

Starting in 2013, the Collaboration for Early Childhood entered a five-year contract with Chapin Hall to build a comprehensive early childhood database. The database will unify administrative data sources, providing users with a view of school enrollment and poverty at a local level in Oak Park. Information on subsidized child care and SNAP benefits will be available at a state level. Once the database is live, providers will be able to access and analyze these data to help inform program and practice decision-making.

Voices of Youth Count Initiative 
Voices of Youth Count is a research initiative on youth experiences of unaccompanied homelessness in the U.S. Chapin Hall partnered with twenty-two counties across the U.S. to conduct "youth-led counts and surveys of young people and providers". The research also included qualitative interviews in five of those twenty-two counties, a national phone survey, a survey of service providers, a review of policy related to youth homelessness, and a systematic review of published evidence on the effectiveness of programs targeting youth homelessness.

Based on these data sources, Voices of Youth Count has produced a series of policy briefs. The first provided an estimate of the scale and character of youth homelessness in the U.S.  The second report focused on lesbian, gay, bisexual, trans, and queer youth, and the third looked at youth homelessness among pregnant or parenting young people.

Reports on youth counts, youth homelessness in the rural U.S., youth trajectories into and through homelessness, child welfare, and education are forthcoming.

Organization 
Chapin Hall employs research and policy staff with experience in child welfare, epidemiology, psychology, social work, statistics, and youth development. The organization began with 15 employees in 1986, and has had more than one hundred employees as of 2013. Annual revenue in 1986 was about five hundred thousand. In 2016, that number stood at over five million dollars.

Bryan Samuels is the current Executive Director of Chapin Hall. He joined the organization in 2013 after serving as the commissioner of the Administration on Children, Youth and Families in Washington D.C. In 2018, Samuels was the recipient of the Bernice Weissbourd Award for Family Support, awarded by Family Focus.

References 

Children's charities based in the United States
Think tanks based in the United States
Social care in the United States
1860 establishments in Illinois
Youth charities
Human welfare organizations based in Chicago
University of Chicago
Social welfare charities based in the United States
Foster care in the United States